Ivydale is an unincorporated community in Clay County, West Virginia, United States. Ivydale has a post office with ZIP code 25113.

Notable Person: Harry R. Truman, killed during the Mount St. Helens eruption, was from Ivydale, WV

References

Unincorporated communities in Clay County, West Virginia
Unincorporated communities in West Virginia